William, Will or Bill Roberts may refer to:

Entertainment
 William Roberts (biographer) (1767–1849), English barrister and legal writer
 William Harris Lloyd Roberts (1884–1955), Canadian writer, poet, and playwright
 William Roberts (painter) (1895–1980), British painter and war artist
 Will Roberts (1907–2000), British painter
 William Roberts (screenwriter) (1913–1997), American screenwriter
 Billy Roberts (1936–2017), American songwriter and musician
 William Owen Roberts (born 1960), Welsh language novelist and playwright
 Rick Ross (born 1976), American rapper, born William Leonard Roberts II
 Will Roberts (fiction), fictional character in the TV soap opera Days of Our Lives

Politics
 William Roberts (Parliamentarian) (1605–1662), British MP and father of Sir William Roberts, 1st Baronet
 William Roberts (Australian politician) (1821–1900), New South Wales politician
 William R. Roberts (1830–1897), U.S. Representative from New York
 W. F. Roberts (William Francis Roberts, 1869–1938), Canadian politician and Minister of Health, New Brunswick
 William Roberts (Alberta politician) (born 1954), Canadian politician, Alberta, 1986–1993
 William Y. Roberts, state representative in Pennsylvania

Religion
 William Roberts (bishop of Bangor) (1585–1665), Anglican bishop
 William Page Roberts (1836–1928), Church of England clergyman, Dean of Salisbury, 1907–1919
 William Henry Roberts (1847–1919), American Baptist missionary in Burma
 William P. Roberts (bishop) (fl. 1909–1950), American Episcopal bishop of Shanghai
 William A. Roberts (born 1946), 25th Chief of the Staff of the Salvation Army
 William Roberts (priest), Welsh priest

Sports

Cricket
 William Roberts (MCC cricketer) (1795–1843), English cricketer
 William Roberts (Australian cricketer), Australian cricketer, played in the 1880s
 William Roberts (Lancashire cricketer) (1914–1951), English cricketer

Football and rugby
 William Roberts (footballer, born 1859) (1859–?), Llangollen F.C., Berwyn Rangers F.C. and Wales international footballer
 William Roberts (footballer, born 1863) (1863–?), Rhyl F.C. and Wales international footballer
 William Roberts (footballer, born 1907) (1907–?), Cardiff City F.C. footballer
 Bill Roberts (footballer, born 1859) (1859–1945), Wrexham A.F.C. and Wales international footballer
 Bill Roberts (footballer, born 1897) (1897–1960), Australian rules footballer for South Melbourne
 Bill Roberts (footballer, born 1908) (1908–1976), Welsh footballer
 Bill Roberts (footballer, born 1910) (1910–1973), Australian rules footballer for Essendon
 Billy Roberts (footballer, born 1880) (1880–?), English footballer
 Billy Roberts (Australian footballer) (1908–1998), Australian rules footballer for St Kilda
 Bill Roberts (American football) (1929–2007), American football player
 William Roberts (rugby union) (1871–1937), New Zealand rugby union player
 Bill Roberts (rugby union) (1906–1965), Welsh rugby international
 William Roberts (American football) (born 1962), former NFL offensive lineman
 Will Roberts (footballer) (born 1994), Welsh footballer

Other sports
 Bill Roberts (athlete) (1912–2001), British runner, gold medal winner in 4 x 100 m relay at the 1936 Olympics
 Bill Roberts (basketball) (1925–2016), American basketball player
 William Roberts (cyclist)  (born 1998), British and Welsh cyclist

Other
 Sir William Roberts, 1st Baronet (1638–1688), British landowner
 William Hayward Roberts (baptised 1734–died 1791), English schoolmaster and poet
 William Prowting Roberts (1806–1871), Chartist who became known as "attorney-general" of the coal miners in the 1840s
 William Milnor Roberts (1810–1881), American civil engineer
 William Roberts (physician) (1830–1899), British scientist
 William Paul Roberts (1841–1910), brigadier general in the Confederate Army
 Bill Roberts (businessman) (1898–1962), British founder of the JET brand of petrol
 William Roberts (veteran) (1900–2006), British veteran of the First World War
 William C. Roberts (born 1932), cardiovascular physician and pathologist
 William Clare Roberts, Canadian political theorist
 William Roberts & Co of Nelson, English steam engine manufacturer

See also
Robert Williams (disambiguation)
Billy Roberts (disambiguation)